MXR North West was a regional commercial digital radio multiplex in the United Kingdom, which served the North West of England. The multiplex closed on 24 September 2013 after the shareholders Global Radio & Arqiva decided not to renew the licence.

Transmitter sites 
MXR North West was broadcast from the following sites:

Stations carried

The following channels were receivable on any digital-equipped DAB radio in the North West area at the time of closure:

Previous services

References

Digital audio broadcasting multiplexes